Levy and Company (French: Lévy et Cie) is a 1930 French comedy film directed by André Hugon starring Léon Belières, Charles Lamy and Alexandre Mihalesco . The film takes place on a liner which is sailing for New York. It was a success and was followed by three sequels including The Levy Department Stores.

The film's art direction was by Christian-Jaque.

Cast
 Henri Bargin
 Lucien Baroux as Louis
 Léon Belières as Salomon Lévy
 Jeanne Bernard
 André Burgère as David Lévy
 Marie Glory as Esther Lévy
 Charles Lamy as Moïse Lévy
 Lugné-Poe as Abraham Lévy
 Rodolphe Marcilly
 Micheline Masson
 Alexandre Mihalesco as Simon Lévy

References

Bibliography 
 Hayward, Susan. French National Cinema. Routledge, 2006.

External links 
 

1930 films
French comedy films
1930 comedy films
1930s French-language films
Films directed by André Hugon
Seafaring films
French black-and-white films
1930s French films